Léo de Almeida Neves (1932 – 2 November 2020) was a Brazilian politician who served as a Deputy.

References

1932 births
2020 deaths
Brazilian politicians